Pull Dawa is a small town near Basti Maluk in Multan district of Pakistan.

Populated places in Multan District